Myristica macrantha is a species of plant in the family Myristicaceae. It is endemic to Fiji.

References

Endemic flora of Fiji
macrantha
Least concern plants
Taxonomy articles created by Polbot
Plants described in 1936